Daniel S. Akerib (born June 19, 1962) is an American particle physicist and astrophysicist. He was elected in 2008 a fellow of the American Physical Society (APS).

Biography
Akerib graduated in 1984 with an A.B. from the University of Chicago and in 1990 with a Ph.D. in physics from Princeton University. A search for the rare decay + → +  is the title of his Ph.D. thesis (which finds experimental limits for a particular type of rare decay involving kaons). As a postdoc he did research from 1990 to 1992 at California Institute of Technology and from 1993 to 1996 at UC Berkeley's Center for Particle Astrophysics (which was started in 1989 with funding from the National Science Foundation). In the physics department of Case Western Reserve University, he was from 1995 to 2001 an assistant professor, from 2001 to 2004 an associate professor, and from 2004 to 2014 a full professor. He also chaired the department from 2007 to 2010. Akerib has been a professor of particle physics and astrophysics at SLAC National Accelerator Laboratory since 2014, with a courtesy full-time professorship in Stanford University's physics department.

Akerib was involved for about two years (from 2019 to 2020) in the CMB-Stage 4 (CMB-S4) experiment to detect primordial gravitational waves and to gather data about the early universe but is no longer involved.

At Case Western Reserve University from 2008 to 2014, he worked with Thomas A. Shutt on the Large Underground Xenon (LUX) experiment to detect dark matter particles. In 2014 both were appointed to professorships at SLAC National Accelerator Laboratory and Stanford University. The two became the leaders of the SLAC establishment of a Liquid Nobles Test Platform. Their group "specializes in detector development, xenon purification, and simulations".

Akerib's 2008 APS fellowship citation is for "significant contributions to direct Dark Matter detection experiments, in particular for his work on the CDMS experiment."

Since the 1990s he has done research on the search for WIMPs, beginning with the Cryogenic Dark Matter Search and in recent years with the Large Underground Xenon experiment and the LUX-ZEPLIN Experiment. He now works on expanding and improving time projection chambers to improve sensitivity for possible detection of WIMPs. Such chambers use liquid xenon as a target medium.

On May 31, 1992, in Lodi, New York, he married Chantal Christ.

Selected publications
  (over 850 citations)
 
 
 
  (over 600 citations)
  (over 900 citations)
  2011 (over 650 citations)
 
 
  (over 2150 citations)
  (over 500 citations)
  (over 1950 citations)

References

External links
 
 
 
 
 

1962 births
Living people
20th-century American physicists
21st-century American physicists
American astrophysicists
Particle physicists
University of Chicago alumni
Princeton University alumni
Case Western Reserve University faculty
Stanford University faculty
Fellows of the American Physical Society